Raphaël Romey (born 26 February 1981) is a French professional footballer who currently plays as a defender for Fréjus Saint-Raphaël.

Kerala Blasters
On 21 August 2014, Romey was drafted by Indian Super League side Kerala Blasters.

References

External links
Raphaël Romey career statistics at foot-national.com

1981 births
Living people
Footballers from Seoul
French footballers
Association football defenders
Grenoble Foot 38 players
ASOA Valence players
FC Échirolles players
SO Cassis Carnoux players
US Marseille Endoume players
Athlético Marseille players
SO Romorantin players
SC Toulon players
Aviron Bayonnais FC players
Gazélec Ajaccio players
CA Bastia players
Ligue 2 players
Kerala Blasters FC players
Kerala Blasters FC draft picks
FC Istres players